John Charles Blaxland (born 1963) is an Australian historian, academic, and former Australian Army officer. He is a Professor in Intelligence Studies and International Security at the Strategic and Defence Studies Centre at the Australian National University.

Blaxland holds a Bachelor of Arts from the University of New South Wales, a Master of Arts in History from the Australian National University, and a Doctor of Philosophy in War Studies from the Royal Military College of Canada. Blaxland also studied at the Royal Thai Army Command and Staff College in 1997. He is a former Director of Joint Intelligence Operations (J2), at Headquarters Joint Operations Command.

Blaxland proposed a new flag design for Australia in 2013.

Blaxland's research interests include Australian military history and strategy, public policy, security, defence, international relations, South East Asia (Thailand, Myanmar/Burma, East Timor), North America (Canada), the Australian Flag, and military operations in Afghanistan and Iraq.

Blaxland was selected in July 2019 to lead an Australian National University team responsible for writing the official history of the Australian Signals Directorate. He stepped down from leading the ANU's Strategic and Defence Studies Centre to work on the official history. ASD Director-General Rachel Noble cancelled the ANU's contract in August or September 2020. At this time Blaxland was reported to have completed half of the first of two planned volumes. Both ASD and the ANU stated that the contract was cancelled by mutual agreement. The Sydney Morning Herald reported that Noble's decision was motivated by a desire to exercise greater control over the official history project.

Bibliography
Blaxland's publications include:

Blaxland, J., & Crawley, R. (2016). The secret cold war: the official history of ASIO, 1975–1989. Sydney: Allen & Unwin.
Blaxland, J 2016, 'Intelligence and Special Operations in the Southwest Pacific, 1942–45', in P.J. Dean (ed.), Australia 1944–45: Victory in the Pacific (Cambridge University Press, Port Melbourne, Australia), pp. 145–168.
Blaxland, J 2015, 'Return to Turmoil: Timor-Leste 2006', in G. Wahlert (ed.), Anzac Cove to Afghanistan: The History of the 3rd Brigade (Big Sky Publishing, Sydney, Australia), pp. 289–298.
Blaxland, J 2015, 'Reflections on the Tactical, Operational and Strategic Lessons of the Intervention', in J Blaxland (ed.), East Timor Intervention: A Retrospective on Interfet, Melbourne University Publishing Limited, South Carlton, pp. 280–294.

References

External links
Coral Bell School of Asia Pacific Affairs profile

1963 births
Australian Army officers
Australian military historians
Australian military personnel of the International Force for East Timor
Academic staff of the Australian National University
Living people
Royal Military College, Duntroon graduates
Royal Military College of Canada alumni
University of New South Wales alumni